LSK-Hallen is an indoor football arena in Lillestrøm, Norway. It is owned, used, and operated by Lillestrøm Sportsklubb. It has a capacity of 3,000 people.

The women's football team LSK Kvinner FK uses the arena as their home ground.

References

Indoor arenas in Norway
Sports venues in Skedsmo
Lillestrøm SK